René Iván García Lavanderos (born 29 August 1989 in Pachuca, Hidalgo, Mexico) is a Mexican professional footballer who most recently played for Sonora of Ascenso MX on loan from Celaya.

References

External links

1989 births
Living people
People from Pachuca
Mexican footballers
Club Celaya footballers
Cimarrones de Sonora players
Liga MX players

Association footballers not categorized by position